Naomhéid is the name given to the founder of the church of Killascobe, County Galway, Ireland. In the 19th century there was a dried-up holy well thirty metres from the church and graveyard in the townland of Corgerry Oughter. It was called Tobar Naomhéid, possibly a corruption of Tobar Naomh Áed ('the well of Saint Áed'). 

Naomhéid may be the Easpag (bishop) Aed mention in a list of early Irish bishops. If so, his diocese would have been the kingdom of Soghain.

References

 The Life, Legends and Legacy of Saint Kerrill: A Fifth-Century East Galway Evangelist, Joseph Mannion, 2004. 0 954798 1 3

Christian clergy from County Galway
Medieval Irish saints
5th-century Irish priests
6th-century Irish bishops